S. B. Patil is a junior college in Pune. Its science and commerce college was Established in 2014. SBPCSC is one of the top college in Pune. It is located in Ravet Pune.

About college

It is science and commerce college. It  provide student excellent knowledge about every subject. It is located in Ravet. It provide bus facility to student who stay away from the college. It managed by PCET trust.

Infrastructure and amenities

Multi purpose hall for indoor games 
Classrooms with E-learning facility
Well equipped laboratories 
Amly stocked library
Spacious Campus 
Reading room
Hostel facility
Bus facility
Tutorial room
Playground for sports and extra curricular activities

Departments

CS & IT Department
English Department
Geography Department
Mathematics Department
Physics Department
Chemistry Department
Biology Department

See also
 List of educational institutions in Pune

External links 
 Official website
 To interact with students, visit 

Science colleges in India
Colleges affiliated to Savitribai Phule Pune University
Universities and colleges in Pune
Education in Pimpri-Chinchwad
Educational institutions established in 2014
2014 establishments in Maharashtra